Shaun Charles Frank (born June 7, 1982) is a Canadian DJ, singer-songwriter and record producer. He was a part of the band Crowned King and later left that to join Envy. He ventured on his own after Envy broke up and has collaborated with EDM artists around the world. He has many charting singles and remixes credited to his name. He is one half of the EDM duo [Kasablanca].

Career 
Shaun Frank was the singer of Crowned King, a Canadian pop/rock band. After that, Frank was involved with The Envy, a Canadian alternative/rock band which was managed by Simmons Records, Gene Simmons' label. The Envy opened for KISS in 2010 on their Hottest Show on Earth Tour. Shaun started his new path after The Envy broke up because of external problems with some band members. Many collaborations with renowned artists of international EDM scene are to his credit (such as Oliver Heldens, Borgeous, KSHMR, DVBBS, and The Chainsmokers).

Frank's remix of Grandtheft and Delaney Jane's song "Easy Go" was featured in the official remix EP. He released the song "Heaven" with American DJ KSHMR who remixed it twice. In 2016, Frank co-wrote the chart-topping single "Closer" by The Chainsmokers. His single "Let You Get Away", which features Ashe was released. The song peaked on Billboard's Dance/Mix Show Airplay chart at 36.

Discography

Extended plays

Charting singles

Other singles
 2013: We Are (with Jake Shanahan & Carl Nunes)  [Armada Trice]
 2013: Unbreakable (with Marien Baker) [EMI Music]
 2014: Vagabond (with Vanrip) [Dim Mak Records]
 2015: Jonezin
 2015: Mind Made Up [Dim Mak Records]
 2015: Time [Size Records]
 2015: All About (with Vanrip) [Dim Mak Records]
 2015: Dope Girlz (with Steve Aoki) [Dim Mak Records]
 2017: No Future (featuring Dyson) [Ultra Music]
 2017: Upsidedown [Ultra Music]
 2017: Addicted (with Violet Days) [Ultra Music]
 2018: Gold Wings (with Krewella) [Ultra Music]
 2018: Bon Appétit (featuring Ya-Le) [Ultra Music]
 2018: Shapes (with Hunter Siegel featuring Roshin) [Spinnin' Records]
 2019: Throwback (with Delaney Jane) [Dirty Pretty Things]
 2019: Where Do You Go (featuring Lexy Panterra) [Spinnin' Records]
 2020: At Night (with 3LAU featuring Grabbitz) [Blume]
 2020: On Your Mind (with Alicia Moffet) [Physical Presents]
 2020: Take Me Over [Physical Presents]
 2021: Crazy (with Tony Romera) [Armada Music]
 2021: Save Me (with Ryland James) [Physical Presents]

Remixes
 2014: Down With Webster – "Chills" (Shaun Frank Remix) [Armada Trice]
 2014: Kiesza – "Take Me to Church" (Shaun Frank Remix) [Dim Mak Records]
 2015: Steve Aoki featuring Flux Pavilion – "Get Me Outta Here" (Shaun Frank Remix) [Ultra Music]
 2015: Vicetone featuring JHart – "Follow Me" (Shaun Frank Remix) [Ultra Music]
 2015: Duke Dumont – "Ocean Drive" (Shaun Frank Remix) [Virgin EMI]
 2015: Grace featuring G-Eazy – "You Don't Own Me" (Shaun Frank Remix) [RCA]
 2016: The Chainsmokers – "Closer" (Shaun Frank Remix) [Disruptor]
 2017: Shawn Hook featuring Vanessa Hudgens – "Reminding Me" (Shaun Frank Remix) [UMG Recordings]
 2017: Cash Cash featuring Conor Maynard – "All My Love" (Shaun Frank Remix) [Big Beat Records]
 2017: Crankdat – "Dollars" [Asylum Records]
 2018: Tritonal featuring Riley Clemmons – "Out My Mind" [Enhanced Music]
 2018: BLVK JVCK featuring Jessie Reyez – "Love Me Still" (Shaun Frank Remix) [Big Beat Records]
 2018: Louis The Child featuring Wafia – "Better Not" (Shaun Frank Remix) [Interscope Records]

Songwriting and Production credits

References

External links
 Shaun Frank on Beatport

1993 births
Canadian DJs
Canadian house musicians
Living people
Musicians from Vancouver
Spinnin' Records artists
Electronic dance music DJs